A chess variant is a game related to, derived from, or inspired by chess. Such variants can differ from chess in many different ways.

"International" or "Western" chess itself is one of a family of games which have related origins and could be considered variants of each other. Chess developed from chaturanga, from which other members of this family, such as shatranj, Tamerlane chess,
shogi, and xiangqi also evolved.

Many chess variants are designed to be played with the equipment of regular chess. Most variants have a similar public-domain status as their parent game, but some have been made into commercial proprietary games. Just as in traditional chess, chess variants can be played over-the-board, by correspondence, or by computer. Some internet chess servers facilitate the play of some variants in addition to orthodox chess.

In the context of chess problems, chess variants are called heterodox chess or fairy chess. Fairy chess variants tend to be created for problem composition rather than actual play.

There are thousands of known chess variants (see list of chess variants). The Classified Encyclopedia of Chess Variants catalogues around two thousand, with the preface noting that—with creating a chess variant being relatively trivial—many were considered insufficiently notable for inclusion.

Evolution of chess

The origins of the chess family of games can be traced to the game of chaturanga during the time of the Gupta Empire in India. Over time, as the game spread geographically, modified versions of the rules became popular in different regions. In Sassanid Persia, a slightly modified form became known as shatranj. Modifications made to this game in Europe resulted in the modern game. Courier chess was a popular variant in medieval Europe, which had a significant impact on the "main" variant's development.

Other games in the chess family, such as shogi (Japan), and xiangqi (China), are also developments from chaturanga made in other regions. These related games are considered chess variants, though the majority of variants are, expressly, modifications of chess. The basic rules of chess were not standardized until the 19th century, and the history of chess before this involves many variants, with the most popular modifications spreading and eventually forming the modern game.

Types of variants 

While some regional variants have historical origins comparable to or even older than chess, the majority of variants are express attempts by individuals or small groups to create new games with chess as a starting point. In most cases the creators are attempting to create new games of interest to chess enthusiasts or a wider audience. Variants normally have the same public domain status as chess, though a few (such as Knightmare Chess) are proprietary, and the materials for play are released as commercial products.

The variations from chess may be done to address a perceived issue with the standard game. For example, Fischer random chess, which randomises the starting positions, was invented by Bobby Fischer to combat what he perceived to be the detrimental dominance of opening preparation in chess. Several variants introduce complications to the standard game, providing an additional challenge for experienced players, for example in Kriegspiel, where players cannot see the pieces of their opponent.

The table below details some, but not all, of the ways in which variants can differ from the orthodox game:

Variants can themselves be developed into further sub-variants, for example Horde chess is a variation upon Dunsany's Chess.

Some variations are created for the purpose of composing interesting puzzles, rather than being intended for full games. This field of composition is known as fairy chess.

Fairy chess gave rise to the term "fairy chess piece" which is used more broadly across writings about chess variants to describe chess pieces with movement rules other than those of the standard chess pieces. Forms of standardised notation have been devised to systematically describe the movement of these. A distinguishing feature of several chess variants is the presence of one or more fairy pieces. Physical models of common fairy pieces are sold by major chess set suppliers.

Notable inventors 

Several chess masters have developed variants, such as Chess960 by Bobby Fischer, Capablanca Chess by José Raúl Capablanca, and Seirawan chess by Yasser Seirawan.

Individuals notable for creating multiple chess variants include V. R. Parton (best known for Alice chess), Ralph Betza, Philip M. Cohen and George R. Dekle Sr.

Some board game designers, notable for works across a wider range of board games, have created chess variants. These include Robert Abbott (Baroque chess) and Andy Looney (Martian chess).

Play 
While chess, shogi, and xiangqi have professional circuits as well as many organised tournaments for amateurs, play of chess variants is predominately on a casual basis.

A few variants have had significant tournaments. Several Gliński's hexagonal chess tournaments were played at the height of the variant's popularity in the 1970s and 1980s. Chess960 has also been the subject of tournaments, including in 2018 an "unofficial world championship" between reigning World Chess Champion Magnus Carlsen and fellow high-ranking Grandmaster Hikaru Nakamura. Likewise Crazyhouse has seen prize-funded unofficial world championship tournaments with top grandmasters and experts of the game on chess.com and lichess.

Several internet chess servers facilitate live play of popular variants, including Chess.com, Lichess, and the Free Internet Chess Server. The software packages Zillions of Games and Fairy-Max have been programmed to support many chess variants.

Some chess engines are also able to play a handful of variants, for instance the version of Stockfish implemented on Lichess is able to play Crazyhouse, King-of-the-hill, Three-check chess, Atomic chess, Horde chess, and Racing Kings. The AI included in Zillions of Games is able to play almost any variant correctly programmed within it to a reasonable standard. Some variants, such as 5D Chess with Multiverse Time Travel, are implausible or even impossible to play physically and exist primarily as video games.

Analysis and study

Notation 
Play in most chess variants is sufficiently similar to chess that games can be recorded with algebraic notation, although additions to this are often required. For example, the third dimension in Millennium 3D Chess means that move notation needs to include the level number, as well as the rank and file—N2g3 means a knight move to the g3 square on the second level. When fairy chess pieces are used, notation requires assigning letters for those pieces.

Scholarship and cataloguing 
Various publications have been written regarding chess variants. Variant Chess magazine was published from 1990 to 2010, being an official publication of the British Chess Variants Society from 1997. This outlined and introduced multiple variants, as well as containing in-depth analyses.

A leading figure in the field was David Pritchard, who authored several books on the topic. Most significantly, he compiled an encyclopedia of variants which outlined thousands of different games. Following Pritchard's death in 2005, the second edition of the encyclopedia was completed and published by John Beasley under the title The Classified Encyclopedia of Chess Variants.

A recent overview of historical and some modern variants was published under the title of A World of Chess in 2017.

The Chess Variant Pages website includes a constantly expanding catalogue of variants.

Computer variant chess 

A few chess variants have been the subject of significant computational analysis. Los Alamos chess, a 6×6 variant, was created in 1956 expressly for computers, its simplicity meant that it was possible for the MANIAC I computer to play it, with a victory over a beginner player the first instance of a computer winning a chess-like game against human opposition. Conversely, Arimaa was developed in 2003 to be deliberately resistant to computer analysis while easy for human players, though computers were able to comprehensively surpass human players by 2015.

While solving chess has not yet been achieved, some variants have been found to be simple enough to be solved though computer analysis. The 5×5 Gardner's Minichess variant has been weakly solved as a draw, and a lengthy analysis of losing chess managed to weakly solve this as a win for white.

Chess variants in fiction 
Chess variants have been invented in various fiction. In The Chessmen of Mars author Edgar Rice Burroughs describes Jetan which depicts a war between two races of Martian. An appendix fully defines the rules of the game. More commonly specifics of fictional variants are not detailed in the original works, though several have been codified into playable games by fans. An example of this is Tri-Dimensional Chess from Star Trek. On-screen play was not conducted to any specific rules, but a comprehensive rulebook has been since developed. Another well known example of fictional chess-like game are the Star Wars holochess, or dejarik.

Chess boxing, a hybrid sport of chess and boxing, was depicted in Froid Équateur, a 1992 comic by Enki Bilal and was developed into a real sport in the early 21st century.

Fictional chess variants can involve fantastical or dangerous elements that cannot be implemented in real life. The Chessmen of Mars describes a form of Jetan where the pieces are human beings and captures are replaced by fights to the death between them. The Doctor Who episode "The Wedding of River Song" depicts "Live Chess", which introduces potentially lethal electric currents into the game.

See also 
 List of chess variants
 Shogi variant
 Xiangqi variant
 Janggi variant

References

Bibliography

Chess variants